The zinc uptake regulator (Zur) gene is a bacterial gene that codes for a transcription factor protein involved in zinc homeostasis. The protein is a member of the ferric uptake regulator family and binds zinc with high affinity. It typically functions as a repressor of zinc uptake proteins via binding to characteristic promoter DNA sequences in a dimer-of-dimers arrangement that creates strong cooperativity. Under conditions of zinc deficiency, the protein undergoes a conformational change that prevents DNA binding, thereby lifting the repression and causing zinc uptake genes such as ZinT and the ZnuABC zinc transporter to be expressed.

References 

Prokaryote genes
Bacterial proteins
Transcription factors